Symbiotes is a genus of beetles in the family Anamorphidae. There are about five described species in Symbiotes.

ITIS Taxonomic note:
Strohecker (1986) indicates the year of authorship should be 1847 rather than 1849 ("Blackwelder, 1949: 93 cites publication of Lied. 2 before Oct. 8, 1847").

Species
These five species belong to the genus Symbiotes:
 Symbiotes armatus Reitter, 1881 g
 Symbiotes duryi Blatchley, 1910 i c g
 Symbiotes gibberosus (Lucas, 1849) i c g b
 Symbiotes impressus Dury, 1912 i c g
 Symbiotes latus Redtenbacher, 1849 g
Data sources: i = ITIS, c = Catalogue of Life, g = GBIF, b = Bugguide.net

References

Further reading

External links

 

Coccinelloidea genera